R. B. (Roger) Sprague (September 12, 1937 – July 28, 2010) was an American Contemporary Realist artist.

Biography
Sprague was born in Buffalo, New York,  and raised in south Arkansas, graduating from El Dorado High School. He attended the University of Oklahoma and graduated with a BA in Fine Arts, with majors in botany, architecture, and finally, in painting. Sprague resided in New York City and worked as booking agent and shipboard companion for United States Lines. He lived for a year on Swan's Island, Maine, where his father's family started life in the U.S. His conviction to make art his life and his living came to fruition in 1975 when he moved to New Mexico, working briefly in Bosque Farms in a plant nursery, then moving to a one-room arrangement in Santa Fe in 1979 where he dedicated his life to his art.

In 2010, Patricia Rovzar Gallery said:
R.B. Sprague is driven by his never-ending exploration of scale and light.  Painting in oil on linen the majority of Sprague's work focuses on interior spaces and the relationships of the objects he places within those spaces.  He defines his compositions with common objects like tables and chairs but always leaves ample room for the viewer to create their own interpretation.

In 1987, R.B. Sprague said in Southwest Art:
I paint what I see, and what attracts me is light and the geometry it illuminates. When I see light on a surface at a particular moment. I think it will follow me for the rest of my life.

Exhibitions
1995 J. Cacciola Galleries NYC
1994 "Realists", Jay Fletcher Gallery Santa Fe, NM
1994 J. Cacciola Galleries NYC
1993 Fletcher Gallery Santa Fe, NM
1992 J. Cacciola Galleries NYC
1992 "Small Paintings", J. Cacciola Galleries NYC
1992 "Summer Invitational Exhibition", J. Cacciola Galleries NYC
1990 Santa Fe East Santa Fe, NM
1990 Western Images Gallery NYC
1989 Santa Fe East Santa Fe, NM
1988 Western Images Gallery NYC
1987 "New Mexico Old and New", Santa Fe East Santa Fe, NM
1987 "Santa Fe Opera Annual Holiday Invitational", Santa Fe, NM
1986 "Quiet Realities II", Santa Fe East Santa Fe, NM
1986 "Inspirations: Churches of New Mexico", Museum of Fine Arts Santa Fe, NM
1986 "Arts at First Plymouth Ninth Annual", Englewood, CO
1985 "Artists of Santa Fe", Oklahoma City, OK
1981 Robert Nichols Gallery Santa Fe, NM
1980 South Arkansas Art Center El Dorado, AR

Selected major collections
Museum of Fine Art
University of Oklahoma

References

External links

R.B. Sprague. In addition to his series of interiors, the artist has been painting more and more exteriors often incorporating landscapes.
RB Sprague studio work
Ventana Fine Art: R.B. Sprague - Paintings
R.B. Sprague Fine Art
 Auctions upcoming for R.B. Sprague

1937 births
2010 deaths
20th-century American painters
American male painters
21st-century American painters
Painters from New York City
Artists from Santa Fe, New Mexico
Realist painters
Modern artists
El Dorado High School (Arkansas) alumni
20th-century American male artists